General Thayer may refer to:

James B. Thayer (1922–2018), U.S. Army brigadier general
John Milton Thayer (1820–1906), Union Army brigadier general and brevet major general
Simeon Thayer (1737–1800), Rhode Island Militia brigadier general
Sylvanus Thayer (1785–1872), Union Army brevet brigadier general